Bayman-e Ariyez (also Romanized as Bāymān-e ‘Arīyeẕ; also known as Bāymān) is a village in Howmeh-ye Gharbi Rural District, in the Central District of Ramhormoz County, Khuzestan Province, Iran. At the 2006 census, its population was 93, in 27 families.

References 

Populated places in Ramhormoz County